The following is a list of Georgia Bulldogs men's basketball head coaches. The Bulldogs have had 25 coaches in their 116-season history. 

† – Does not include 1 win and 1 loss from the 1985 NCAA tournament vacated due to sanctions.

‡ – Does not include 30 wins and 1 loss vacated due to sanctions.

References 

Georgia

Georgia Bulldogs basketball coaches